Taylor "Tates" Locke (born February 25, 1937) is an American former basketball coach. He was described by Rick Telander in the March 8, 1982 issue of Sports Illustrated as being "as high-strung, aggressive and gung-ho over college coaching as anyone has ever been."

Coaching career
Locke coached for West Point, where he hired a young assistant coach named Bobby Knight. Knight would later replace Locke when Locke left West Point. After West Point, Locke moved on to Miami University in Oxford, Ohio, winning a MAC title in 1968–69.

Locke resigned from his Miami post to replace Bobby Roberts as head coach at Clemson University on March 18, 1970. After a season in which the Tigers had its best record in eight years at 17–11 and shared second place with North Carolina and North Carolina State in the Atlantic Coast Conference, he announced his resignation on March 20, 1975 amid a National Collegiate Athletic Association (NCAA) investigation into alleged violations involving offering money to recruit Moses Malone and furnishing cars to five Tigers players including Tree Rollins, Skip Wise and Stan Rome. Locke was succeeded by Bill Foster on April 9. Clemson's men's basketball program was placed on three years probation on October 7.

Locke's only experience at the professional level was made possible by Jack Ramsay who brought him to the Buffalo Braves as an assistant coach and chief scout beginning in 1975–76. When Ramsay's contract wasn't renewed the day after the Braves were eliminated by the Boston Celtics from the playoffs, Locke was promoted and signed a two-year contract to succeed him as the franchise's fourth head coach three days later on May 6, 1976. He vowed to build "one hell of an aggressive basketball team."

Once the 1976–77 season started, the Braves traded Bob McAdoo and Tom McMillen to the New York Knicks and Moses Malone to the Houston Rockets. Locke was also at odds with Ernie DiGregorio and John Shumate. With the Braves at 16–30,  games behind the Atlantic Division-leading Philadelphia 76ers and in the midst of a five-match losing streak, he was fired and replaced on an interim basis by general manager Bob MacKinnon on January 25, 1977.

He succeeded Don Beasley as head coach at Jacksonville University on March 23, 1978. He took the Dolphins to an NCAA berth and NIT berth.

After assistant stints at UNLV and Indiana, Locke would accept the head coach vacancy at Indiana State University.  In his first season, he doubled the win total of his predecessor; in his second season, the Sycamores finished the season at 14-14 (.500) and Locke would be named MVC Coach of the Year.  Though achieving modest success, he resigned under pressure after five seasons.  He later worked as a scout and assistant general manager for the Portland Trail Blazers.

Locke co-authored with Bob Ibach Caught in the Net, a 1982 book about his transgressions as a college basketball head coach, primarily during his time at Clemson. The book inspired the 1994 film Blue Chips.

Head coaching record

College

References

Locke, Tates and Ibach, B. (1982). Caught in the Net [autobiography]. Leisure Press.

External links
 

1937 births
Living people
American men's basketball players
Army Black Knights men's basketball coaches
Basketball controversies
Buffalo Braves head coaches
Clemson Tigers men's basketball coaches
College men's basketball head coaches in the United States
Indiana Hoosiers men's basketball coaches
Indiana State Sycamores men's basketball coaches
Jacksonville Dolphins men's basketball coaches
Miami RedHawks men's basketball coaches
Ohio Wesleyan Battling Bishops men's basketball coaches
Ohio Wesleyan Battling Bishops men's basketball players
Portland Trail Blazers executives
Portland Trail Blazers scouts
UNLV Runnin' Rebels basketball coaches